Akhono Onek Raat is a 1997 Bangladeshi film directed by Khan Ataur Rahman and starring Bangladeshi actors Farida Akhtar Babita, Farooque and Shuchorita. Khan Ataur Rahman earned both Best Music and Best Lyricist Award at Bangladeshi National Film Awards with this film.

Awards
22nd Bangladesh National Film Awards
Best Music Director - Khan Ataur Rahman
Best Lyricist - Khan Ataur Rahman

References

External links
 

1997 films
Bengali-language Bangladeshi films
Films scored by Khan Ataur Rahman
1990s Bengali-language films